Silvio Clementelli (28 October 1926 – 4 December 2001) was an Italian film producer. He produced more than 50 films between 1953 and 1991. He was a member of the jury at the 1989 Cannes Film Festival.

Selected filmography
 Policarpo (1959)
 Estate Violenta (1959)
 Ferdinando I, re di Napoli (1959)
 The Passionate Thief (1960)
 Three Nights of Love (1964)
 When Women Had Tails (1970)
 Ninì Tirabusciò: la donna che inventò la mossa (1970)
 Traffic Jam (1979)

References

External links
 

1926 births
2001 deaths
Italian film producers
Nastro d'Argento winners